Michael Ellis Fisher (3 September 1931 – 26 November 2021) was an English physicist, as well as chemist and mathematician, known for his many seminal contributions
to statistical physics, including but not restricted to the theory of phase transitions and critical phenomena.  He was the Horace White Professor of Chemistry, Physics, and Mathematics at Cornell University.  Later he moved to the University of Maryland College of Computer, Mathematical, and Natural Sciences, where he was University System of Maryland Regents Professor, a Distinguished University Professor and Distinguished Scholar-Teacher.

Academic background 

Michael E. Fisher received his BSc from King's College London in 1951, where he also earned a PhD in physics in 1957, studying analogue computing under Donald MacCrimmon MacKay. He was appointed to the faculty as a lecturer the following year, becoming a full professor in 1965.

In 1966 he moved to Cornell University where he became professor of chemistry, physics, and mathematics, chairing the chemistry department from 1975 to 1978. In 1971, he became a Fellow of the Royal Society. In 1973, he and Jack Kiefer were the first two Cornell faculty elected as Horace White Professors. Fisher was elected Secretary of the Cornell University Senate. In 1983, he was elected a foreign associate of the United States National Academy of Sciences, chemistry section, as he had remained a citizen of the United Kingdom. 

Since 1987 he was at the Institute for Physical Science and Technology, which is part of the University of Maryland College of Computer, Mathematical, and Natural Sciences.  He retired in 2012.

Fisher lived in Ithaca, N.Y., and subsequently in Maryland, with his wife Sorrel. They had four children. Two of them are also theoretical physicists: Daniel S. Fisher is professor of Applied Physics at Stanford, while Matthew P. A. Fisher is professor of Physics at the University of California, Santa Barbara.

Wolf Prize 

Fisher together with Kenneth G. Wilson and Leo Kadanoff won the Wolf Prize in 1980. The prize was awarded with the following comment:"Professor Michael E. Fisher has been an extraordinarily productive scientist, and one still at the height of his powers and creativity. Fisher's major contributions have been in equilibrium statistical mechanics, and have spanned the full range of that subject. He was mainly responsible for bringing together, and teaching a common language to chemists and physicists working on diverse problems of phase transitions."

Boltzmann Medal 

In 1983, Fisher was awarded the Boltzmann Medal "for his many illuminating contributions to phase transitions and critical phenomena during the past 25 years"

Lars Onsager Prize 
Fisher won the Lars Onsager Prize in 1995 "for his numerous and seminal contributions to statistical mechanics, including but not restricted to the theory of phase transitions and critical phenomena, scaling laws, critical exponents, finite size effects, and the application of the renormalization group to many of the above problems" (official laudatio).

Award and honours
 Guggenheim Fellowship (1970)
 Irving Langmuir Prize of the American Physical Society (1971)
 Fellow of the American Academy of Arts and Sciences (1979)
  Guthrie Medal and Prize from the Institute of Physics (1980)
 Wolf Prize (1980)
 Michelson–Morley Award from Case Western Reserve University (1982)
 Boltzmann Medal of the International Union of Pure and Applied Physics (1983)
 Foreign associate of the United States National Academy of Sciences (1983)
 NAS Award for Scientific Reviewing of the National Academy of Sciences (1983)
 Member of the American Philosophical Society (1993)
 Lars Onsager Prize of American Physical Society (1995)
 Royal Medal in physics (2005):
 2009 BBVA Foundation Frontiers of Knowledge Award in Basic Sciences (co-winner with Richard Zare); see
 2015 Rudranath Capildeo Prize for Applied Sciences and Technology-Gold, awarded by the Trinidad and Tobago's National Institute of Higher Education, Research, Science and Technology (NIHERST)

References

Sources
 N. David Mermin, "My Life with Fisher", J. Stat. Phys. 110, 467–473 (2003); see also.

External links
Homepage at University of Maryland
Wolf prize citation
Boltzmann medal citation
Lars Onsager prize citation
BBVA award citation
 

1931 births
2021 deaths
Alumni of King's College London
Fellows of King's College London
Academics of King's College London
Cornell University faculty
Fellows of the Royal Society
British physicists
Wolf Prize in Physics laureates
University of Maryland, College Park faculty
Royal Medal winners
Fellows of the American Academy of Arts and Sciences
Foreign associates of the National Academy of Sciences
People from Siparia region
Members of the American Philosophical Society